The Majdanek trials were a series of consecutive war-crime trials held in Poland and in Germany during and after World War II, constituting the overall longest Nazi war crimes trial in history spanning over 30 years. The first judicial trial of Majdanek extermination camp officials took place from November 27, 1944, to December 2, 1944, in Lublin, Poland. The last one, held at the District Court of Düsseldorf began on November 26, 1975, and concluded on June 30, 1981. It was West Germany's longest and most expensive trial, lasting 474 sessions.

A number of former high ranking SS men, camp officials, camp guards, and SS staff were arraigned before the courts on charges of war crimes and crimes against humanity committed at Majdanek in the period between October 1, 1941, and July 22, 1944. Notably, only 170 Nazis who served at Majdanek had been prosecuted at all, of the 1,037 camp personnel known by name. Half of the defendants charged by the West German justice system were acquitted of killing. By contrast, those tried earlier by Poland were usually found guilty. During the 34 months of camp operation, more than 79,000 people were murdered at Majdanek main camp alone (59,000 of them Polish Jews) and between 95,000 and 130,000 people in the entire Majdanek, system including several subcamps. Some 18,000 Jews were killed at Majdanek on November 3, 1943, during the largest single-day, single-camp massacre of the Holocaust, named Harvest Festival (totalling 43,000 with 2 subcamps).

Notably, two KL Majdanek concentration camp commandants were put on trial by the SS themselves in the course of the camp operation partly because of what Majdanek was initially, merely a storage depot for gold, money and furs stolen from trainloads of Holocaust victims at murder factories in Belzec, Sobibor, and Treblinka. Both SS men were charged with wholesale stealing from the Third Reich to become rich. Karl-Otto Koch (serving at Majdanek from July 1941 till August 24, 1942) was executed by firing squad on April 5, 1945; Hermann Florstedt, the third chief of Majdanek (from October 1942 on) was executed by the SS on April 15, 1945.

First Majdanek trial
Retreating Germans did not have time to destroy the facility. It remained the best preserved example of a Holocaust death camp in history, with intact gas chambers and crematoria. The advancing Soviets were the first Allied soldiers to see the gas chambers, and initially overestimated the total number of victims.

A group of six members of Majdanek personnel – who had not managed to escape – were arraigned before the Soviet-Polish Special Criminal Court immediately following the camp's liberation of July 23, 1944. They were SS-Obersturmführer Anton Thernes,  Wilhelm Gerstenmeier,  Hermann Vögel, Kapo Edmund Pohlmann, SS-Rottenführer Theodor Schöllen and Kapo Heinrich Stalp, After the trial, and deliberations which lasted from November 27, 1944 to December 2, 1944 all of accused, except for Pohlmann, who had committed suicide on November 28, were found guilty of war crimes and sentenced to death by hanging. They were all hanged on December 3, 1944.

Second Majdanek trial (1946–1948) 
The series of trials which took place between 1946 and 1948 in Poland – usually referred to as the Second trial of Majdanek – consisted of trials of many kinds. Some 95 SS-men, mostly guards (including those apprehended hiding in postwar Germany), were charged with war crimes and crimes against humanity. Seven of the defendants were given the death penalty. The most prominent of them was Elsa Ehrich, Oberaufseherin of the women and children camp division (liquidated in spring of 1944). She was responsible for the selections to gas chambers. Ehrich was found guilty of all charges, and hanged in July 1948. Apparently, Ehrich made an attempt to launch a Nazi brothel in 1943, but the project was abandoned before fruition after one of her slave sex-workers was diagnosed with typhus.

Most other SS men were sentenced from 2 to 12 years' imprisonment. Some of the more prominent defendants in the 1946–1948 series of trials included over 60 SS-Schütze camp guards. The multiple proceedings were held in Lublin, as well as in Radom and Świdnica (1947), Kraków, Wadowice, and Toruń (1948) and in Warsaw (1948), where the last appellate court case of Jacob Gemmel took place in November 1950.

{| width="95%" border="1" cellpadding="2" cellspacing="0" style="font-size: 90%; border: gray solid 1px; border-collapse: collapse; text-align: middle;"
! style="text-align:center;background:#B0C4DE"|Defendant 
! style="text-align:center;background:#B0C4DE"|Born
! style="text-align:center;background:#B0C4DE"|Rank
! style="text-align:center;background:#B0C4DE"|Function
! style="text-align:center;background:#B0C4DE"|Sentence
|-
|Elsa Ehrich||Mar. 8, 1914||Oberaufseherin||Senior Overseer|| Death by hanging (carried out, Oct. 26, 1948)
|-
|Friedrich Gebhardt||Feb. 26, 1899||SS-Unterscharf.||Camp guard|| Death by hanging (carried out, Nov. 15, 1948)
|-
|Kurt Möller (Moeller)||Jan. 11, 1918||SS-Oberscharf.||Squad leader|| Death by hanging (carried out, Oct. 6, 1948)
|-
|Jacob Niessner||Jan. 19, 1908||SS-Schütze||Camp guard|| Death by hanging (carried out, Jul. 14, 1948)
|-
|Michael Pelger||Mar. 27, 1908||SS-Rottenf.||Squad leader|| Death by hanging (carried out, Jun. 18, 1948)
|-
|Peter Reiss||Feb. 22, 1901||SS-Sturmmann||Stormtrooper|| Death by hanging (carried out, Jun. 23, 1948)
|-
|Franz Söss (Süss)||Nov. 30, 1912||SS-Rottenf.||Squad leader|| Death by hanging (carried out, Sept. 20, 1949)
|-
|Friedrich Buschbaum||Sept. 14, 1904||SS-Schütze||Camp guard|| Death by hanging (commuted to 15 years imprisonment, rel. May 31, 1956)
|-
|Johann Weiss||Feb. 24, 1915||SS-Schütze||Camp guard|| Death by hanging (commuted to 10 years imprisonment)
|-
|Johann Vormittag||Aug. 5, 1904||SS-Schütze||Camp guard|| life imprisonment (released Mar. 11, 1959)
|-
|Jacob Gemmel||May 27, 1913||SS-Schütze||Camp guard|| life (commuted to 12 years imprisonment)
|-
|Robert Frick||Oct. 15, 1918||SS-Unterscharf.||Camp guard|| 15 years imprisonment (released May 2, 1956) 
|-
|Georg Fleischer||Nov. 24, 1911||SS-Schütze||Camp guard|| 12 years imprisonment (released May 2, 1956) 
|-
|Johann Kessler||Feb. 28, 1910||SS-Sturmmann||Stormtrooper|| 12 years imprisonment (died in prison, Feb. 25, 1951) 
|-
|Hans Kottre (Kotre)||Aug. 22, 1912||SS-Sturmmann||Stormtrooper|| 12 years imprisonment (released May 9, 1956)
|-
|Andreas Lahner||Dec. 10, 1921||SS-Sturmmann||Stormtrooper|| 12 years imprisonment (released May 2, 1956)
|-
|Georg Neu||Aug. 1, 1921||SS-Schütze||Camp guard|| 12 years imprisonment (released May 9, 1956)
|-
|Franz Wirth||Nov. 8, 1909||SS-Rottenf.||Camp guard|| 12 years imprisonment 
|-
|Andreas Buttinger||May 29, 1910||SS-Schütze||Camp guard|| 10 years imprisonment (died in prison, Apr. 26, 1949)
|-
|Jacob Jost||Oct. 6, 1895||SS-Oberscharf.||Camp guard|| 10 years imprisonment (released Apr. 30, 1956)
|-
|Martin Löx||Feb. 7, 1908||SS-Rottenf.||Camp guard|| 10 years imprisonment (died in prison, Jun. 26, 1949)
|-
|Kasper Marksteiner||Nov. 1, 1913||SS-Sturmmann||Camp guard|| 10 years imprisonment (died in prison, Jun. 20, 1949)
|-
|Hans Aufmuth||Jan. 18, 1905||SS-Schütze||Camp guard|| 8 years imprisonment (released Mar. 17, 1954)
|-
|Johann Betz||Dec. 18, 1906||SS-Sturmmann||Camp guard|| 8 years imprisonment (released Jul. 3, 1955)
|-
|Anton Hoffmann||Sept. 17, 1910||SS-Sturmmann||Camp guard|| 8 years imprisonment (released Dec. 17, 1954)
|-
|Johann Radler||Sept. 9, 1909||SS-Schütze||Camp guard|| 8 years imprisonment (released Mar. 1, 1955)
|-
|Thomas Radrich||Oct. 19, 1912||SS-Rottenf.||Camp guard|| 8 years imprisonment 
|-
|Johann Setz||Jun. 26, 1907||SS-Sturmman||Camp guard|| 8 years imprisonment (extradited to Germany, Feb. 28, 1955)
|-
|Michael Bertl||Jun. 23, 1909||SS-Sturmmann||Camp guard|| 7 years imprisonment (released Jul. 15, 1954)
|-
|Paul Keller||Oct. 16, 1910||SS-Sturmmann||Camp guard|| 7 years imprisonment (released Jul. 15, 1954)
|-
|Karl Müller||Mar. 10, 1907||SS-Sturmmann||Block leader|| 7 years imprisonment 
|-
|Walter Biernat||Mar. 28, 1920||SS-Rottenf.||Camp guard|| 6 years imprisonment (died in prison, Feb. 6, 1952) 
|-
|Josef Hartmann||Mar. 22, 1918||SS-Sturmmann||Camp guard|| 6 years imprisonment (released Jan. 5, 1954) 
|-
|Hans Georg Hess||Jun. 17, 1910||SS-Rottenf.||Camp guard|| 6 years imprisonment 
|-
|Heinrich Kühn||Dec. 16, 1909||SS-Sturmmann||Guard (Auschwitz)|| 6 years imprisonment (died in prison, Apr. 16, 1951) 
|-
|Franz Vormittag||Jan. 23, 1920||SS-Sturmmann||Camp guard|| 6 years imprisonment 
|-
|Helmut Zach||Aug. 19, 1909||SS-Unterscharf.||Camp guard|| 6 years imprisonment 
|-
|Jacob Dialler||Dec. 8, 1913||SS-Sturmmann||Camp guard|| 5 years imprisonment (released Dec. 23, 1951)
|-
|Hans Durst||Nov. 23, 1909||SS-Rottenf.||Camp guard|| 5 years imprisonment 
|-
|Franz Kaufmann||Jul. 23, 1908||SS-Unterscharf.||Camp guard|| 5 years imprisonment 
|-
|Paul Kiss||Jul. 13, 1902||SS-Sturmmann||Camp guard|| 5 years imprisonment (died Apr. 26, 1950)
|-
|Johann Kubasak||Dec. 31, 1909||SS-Rottenf.||Camp guard|| 5 years imprisonment 
|-
|Johann Lassner||Jul. 26, 1909||SS-Schütze||Camp guard|| 5 years imprisonment 
|-
|Johann Lienert||Aug. 5, 1915||SS-Sturmmann||Camp guard|| 5 years imprisonment (died Jun. 16, 1949)
|-
|Stefan Mantsch||Sept. 24, 1922||SS-Schütze||Camp guard|| 5 years imprisonment (released Apr. 12, 1951)
|-
|Hans Merle||May 15, 1914||SS-Schütze||Camp guard|| 5 years imprisonment (released Jan. 2, 1953)
|-
|Kurt Erwin Ohnweiler||Mar. 25, 1913||SS-Schütze||Camp guard|| 5 years imprisonment (released Mar. 1, 1952)
|-
|Michael Thal||Jan. 16, 1910||SS-Schütze||Camp guard|| 5 years imprisonment 
|-
|Jacob Vormittag||Mar. 8, 1909||SS-Sturmman||Camp guard|| 5 years imprisonment 
|-
|Martin Berger||Jan. 18, 1910||SS-Rottenf.||Camp guard|| 4 years imprisonment (died in prison, Oct. 15, 1948)
|-
|Michael Fleischer||Aug. 18, 1912||SS-Rottenf.||Camp guard|| 4 years imprisonment 
|-
|Franz Habel||May 31, 1912||SS-Rottenf.||Camp guard|| 4 years imprisonment 
|-
|Karl Brückner||May 5, 1904||SS-Unterscharf.||Camp guard|| 4 years imprisonment (released Feb. 28, 1951) 
|-
|Josef Janowitsch||Aug. 22, 1910||SS-Sturmmann||Camp guard|| 4 years imprisonment 
|-
|Johann Günesch||May 17, 1913||SS-Schütze||Camp guard|| 3.5 years imprisonment (extradited to Germany, Feb. 9, 1951)
|-
|Fritz Frischolz||Oct. 5, 1911||SS-Oberscharf.||Camp guard|| 8 years imprisonment (released Mar. 10, 1955)
|-
|Michael Gall||Jul. 22, 1902||SS-Schütze||Camp guard|| 3 years imprisonment (extradited to Germany, Jan. 15, 1951)
|-
|Hans Grabert||May 31, 1907||SS-Oberscharf||Administration|| 3 years imprisonment (extradited to Germany, Jun. 16, 1950)
|-
|Stefan Mantsch||Sept. 24, 1922||SS-Schütze||Camp guard|| 3 years imprisonment (released Apr. 12, 1951)
|-
|Josef Moos||Jan. 24, 1904||SS-Rottenf.||Infirmary (selections)|| 3 years imprisonment (died in prison, Apr. 20, 1950)
|-
|Konrad Anacker||Feb. 13, 1892||SS-Schütze||Camp guard|| 3 years imprisonment (released Jun. 26, 1950)
|-
|Wilhelm Reinartz
|Mar. 17, 1910
|SS-Unterscharf.
|Infirmary
| 2 years imprisonment
|-
|Wilhelm Petrak||Feb. 14, 1909||SS-Sturmmann||Camp guard|| 8 years (died Jul. 28, 1948 of disease after 2 years) 
|-
|}

Third Majdanek trial (1975–1981)
At the Third Majdanek Trial, held between November 26, 1975, and June 30, 1981, before a West German Court at Düsseldorf, sixteen defendants were arraigned. Five were cleared of all charges, two released due to ill health, one died of old age, and eight were found guilty. They were sentenced to 3 to 12 years imprisonment. The 3rd Majdanek trial was preceded by the Treblinka Trials also at Düsseldorf in 1964 and 1970. The Majdanek trial lasted for six years, and concluded on June 30, 1981. There were insufficient grounds to lay charges against other suspects according to the prosecution (many of the key witnesses having died).

Notably, the camp deputy commandant, Arnold Strippel, implicated in the torture and killing of many dozens of prisoners (including 42 Soviet POWs in July 1942), received a nominal -year sentence. He also received 121,500-Deutsche Mark reimbursement for the loss of earnings and his social security contributions, which he used to purchase a condominium in Frankfurt, which he occupied until his death.

{| width="95%" border="1" cellpadding="2" cellspacing="0" style="font-size: 90%; border: gray solid 1px; border-collapse: collapse; text-align: middle;"
! style="text-align:center;background:#B0C4DE"|Defendant
! style="text-align:center;background:#B0C4DE"|Born
! style="text-align:center;background:#B0C4DE"|Rank
! style="text-align:center;background:#B0C4DE"|Function
! style="text-align:center;background:#B0C4DE"|Sentence
|-
|Alice Orlowski||Sept. 30, 1903||SS Aufseherin||Camp overseer|| died of old age during the trial 
|-
|Hermine Braunsteiner||Jul. 16, 1919||Rapportführerin||Female camp deputy|| life imprisonment
|-
|Hildegard Lachert||Mar. 19, 1920||Aufseherin||Camp overseer|| 12 years imprisonment 
|-
|Hermann Hackmann||Nov. 11, 1913||SS-Hauptst.||Camp commandant|| 10 years imprisonment 
|-
|Emil Laurich||May 21, 1921||SS-Rottenf.||Ideology|| 8 years imprisonment 
|-
|Heinz Villain||Feb. 1, 1921||SS-Unterscharf.||Field commandant|| 6 years imprisonment 
|-
|Fritz-Heinrich Petrick||Jan. 22, 1913||SS-Oberscharf.||Camp guard|| 4 years imprisonment 
|-
|Arnold Strippel||Jun. 2, 1911||SS-Obersturm.||Camp director|| 3.5 years imprisonment 
|-
|Thomas Ellwanger||Mar. 3, 1917||SS-Unterscharf.||Camp guard|| 3 years imprisonment 
|-
|Wilhelm Reinartz||Mar. 17, 1910||SS-Unterscharf.||Infirmary (selections)|| released due to illness 
|-
|Joanna (Johanna) Zelle|| ||SS-Gefolge||Camp guard|| released due to illness 
|-
|Heinrich Schmidt||Mar. 27, 1912||SS-Hauptsturmf.||Medic (selections)|| acquitted and released 
|-
|Charlotte Mayer||Feb. 7, 1918|| ||Maintenance|| acquitted and released 
|-
|Rosy Suess or (Rosa) Süss||Sept. 16, 1920|| ||Maintenance|| acquitted and released 
|-
|Heinrich Groffmann|| ||SS-Rottenf.||Field commandant|| acquitted and released 
|-
|Hermine Boettcher-Brueckner ||Apr. 26, 1918|| ||Maintenance|| acquitted and released 
|-
|}

Post 1981 Majdanek War Crimes Trials
In 1989 Karl-Friedrich Höcker was tried and sentenced for his actions in Majdanek.

See also
 Auschwitz trial held in Kraków, Poland in 1947. Tried 40 SS staff of the Auschwitz concentration camp
 Belsen trial
 Belzec trial before the 1st Munich District Court in the mid-1960s, of eight SS-men of the Belzec extermination camp
 Chełmno trials of the Chełmno extermination camp personnel, held in Poland and in Germany. The cases were decided almost twenty years apart
 Dachau trials held within the walls of the former Dachau concentration camp, 1945–1948
 Mauthausen-Gusen camp trials
 Nuremberg Trials of the 23 most important leaders of the Third Reich, 1945–1946
 Ravensbrück trial
 Sobibor trial held in Hagen, Germany in 1965, concerning the Sobibor extermination camp personnel
 Treblinka trials in Düsseldorf, Germany

Notes and references

 
Holocaust trials
Trials in Poland